Jesús Alberto Santa Cruz Mares (born 25 March 1986 in Tampico, Tamaulipas, Mexico) is a Mexican footballer, who plays as goalkeeper for Puebla F.C. in Primera División.

External links
 
 
Stats at Mediotiempo.com
Puebla F.C. Player Page

1986 births
Living people
Club Puebla players
Liga MX players
Sportspeople from Tampico, Tamaulipas
Association football goalkeepers
Footballers from Tamaulipas
Mexican footballers